Sadia is a feminine given name.

List of people with the given name 

 Sadia Khateeb, Indian actress and model
 Sadia Khan, Pakistani television and film actress
 Sadia Jahan Prova, Bangladeshi model and television actress
 Sadia Rashid (born 1946), Pakistani educationist
 Sadia Sheikh (died 2007), Pakistani murder victim
 Sadia Imam, Pakistani television presenter, actress and model
 Sadia Bashir, Pakistani computer scientist
 Sadia Ghaffar, Pakistani actress and model
 Sadia Olivier Bleu, Ivorian professional footballer
 Sadia Sadia, Canadian-born British installation artist
 Sadia Jabbar, Pakistani television and film producer; founder of Sadia Jabbar Production which was established in 2014
 Sadia Islam Mou, Bangladeshi model and television actress
 Sadia Nadeem Malik, Pakistani politician
 Sadia Azmat, British stand-up comedian
 Sadia Dehlvi, Indian writer

See also 

 Saadia (given name)

Pakistani feminine given names